Haitiansan Road is a station on Line 2 of the Shanghai Metro in the Pudong New Area.

References

Line 2, Shanghai Metro
Shanghai Metro stations in Pudong
Railway stations in China opened in 2010
Railway stations in Shanghai